The Gan Israel Camping Network ('Garden of Israel') is a group of Chabad-Lubavitch summer camps. The network claims a total enrolment of over 100,000 children.

History
The first Chabad-affiliated summer camp was a girls' overnight camp, Camp Emunah, in Greenfield Park, New York (where it still located), founded in 1953 by Rabbi Jacob J. Hecht. In 1956, the Lubavitcher Rebbe, Rabbi Menachem Schneerson, directed some young men to open a parallel boys' overnight camp under the auspices of the Merkos L'Inyonei Chinuch organization. He chose the name Gan Israel ("Garden of Israel") for this camp, after the founder of Chassidism, Rabbi Israel Baal Shem Tov. Camp Gan Israel moved to its current location in Parksville, New York in 1969.

Rabbi Schneerson visited both of these camps in 1956 (before the camp season began), 1957 and 1960 (during the camp season). Since the early 1990s, the Rebbe's visits have formed an important part of the oral history of Camp Gan Israel in Parksville (and the other camps in the network), and are frequently referred to in song and in print.

Other branches of Gan Israel overnight camps were founded near Montreal 
(1958, in Labelle, Quebec), London, Detroit (1961, in Kalkaska Township, Michigan), Melbourne (1960s), Florida (2007), Toronto (2012), and others. In addition, several hundred Gan Israel day camps exist around the world.

Activities
The majority of the children that attend Chabad-Lubavitch summer camps are from unaffiliated Jewish homes. To this end, camps offer introductory classes and programs in Judaism. In addition, a growing number of Chabad-Lubavitch summer camps are now equipped to aid children with special needs.

Many camps offer cyber art, wilderness survival, tennis, karate, and mountain biking. Special trips to theme parks, bowling and creative Shabbat overnights complement the spiritual programs that are the hallmark of Chabad-Lubavitch, namely daily study and prayer, Jewish song and dance, ritual arts and crafts, and a wide variety of activities designed to generate interest and excitement in Jewish history, observance and the performance of good deeds.

External links
Camp Gan Israel Directory

References 

Jewish summer camps
Chabad organizations
Jewish organizations established in 1956
Chabad-Lubavitch (Hasidic dynasty)